Fatemeh Hashemi Rafsanjani is an Iranian politician.

She is a senior member of the Moderation and Development Party and runs the Charity Foundation for Special Diseases.

In 1995, she was head of Iran's delegation to the Organization of Islamic Countries' 1st symposium on women's role in Islamic society, held in Tehran. She is also secretary-general of the Women's Solidarity Association of Iran.

References 

Living people
Moderation and Development Party politicians
Akbar Hashemi Rafsanjani
Iranian philanthropists
Iranian women's rights activists
Year of birth uncertain
Children of national leaders
Year of birth missing (living people)